Ehsan ur Rehman Mazari (born 14 August 1981) is a Pakistani politician who has been a member of the National Assembly of Pakistan, since August 2018. Previously he was a member of the National Assembly from June 2013 to May 2018.

Early life
He was born on 14 August   1981.

Political career

He was elected to the National Assembly of Pakistan as a candidate of Pakistan Peoples Party (PPP) from Constituency NA-210 (Kashmore) in 2013 Pakistani general election. He received 55,808 votes and defeated an independent candidate, Mir Ghalib Hussain Domki.

He was re-elected to the National Assembly as a candidate of PPP from Constituency NA-198 (Kashmore) in 2018 Pakistani general election.

He took oath as Federal Minister on 19th April, 2022 and headed the IPC 

(Urdu: وزارت انسانی حقوق, abbreviated as MoHR). 

On 21st April 2022 his portfolio was changed from Federal Minister for Human Rights as Federal Minister for Inter Provincial Coordination.

References

Living people
Pakistan People's Party politicians
Sindhi people
Pakistani MNAs 2013–2018
People from Sindh
1981 births
Pakistani MNAs 2018–2023